Taipan Place is a 22-storey office building in Ortigas Center, Pasig.

Tenants
Building occupants include Figaro Coffee, Seaoil, COMNET, Daiichi Properties, BlackBerry, Northern Telecom, Whiteplane Inc. and Dyson.

References

Skyscrapers in Ortigas Center